Pentti Kalevi Karvonen (15 August 1931 – 12 March 2022) was a Finnish steeplechase runner. He competed in the men's 3000 metres steeplechase at the 1960 Summer Olympics. Karvonen died on 12 March 2022, at the age of 90.

References

External links
 

1931 births
2022 deaths
People from Primorsk, Leningrad Oblast
Finnish male steeplechase runners
Finnish male cross country runners
Olympic athletes of Finland
Athletes (track and field) at the 1960 Summer Olympics